The registrar is a chief executive officer of a judicial forum. They are in charge of the entire registry of the department.

In common law jurisdictions, registrars are usually judicial officers with the power to hear certain civil matters such as interlocutory applications and assessment of damages.  In some jurisdictions, they may also hear trials of cases if both parties consent.  Registrars are assisted by deputy-registrars, who in common law jurisdictions are sometimes called masters.

The registrar is the chief administrator of the department, normally they happen to be the head of the department. The posts of the registrar are generally created in a judicial forums such as tribunals, high courts and supreme courts and in educational universities. In the judicial forum, they manage both administrative and judicial sides in departments under the authority of the president/chairman of the tribunals and chief justices of the high courts and supreme courts. The government may also appoint one or more assistant/deputy registrars. They help the courts, the registrar, the president/chairperson, and the judges in all their official/judicial functions. They are exercising delegated powers of the Registrar. They are guardian of the seals and responsible for the court's archives and publications. 

The registrar is responsible for the administrative and judicial work as are assigned by the president/chairman/judges of the tribunal/court. In the event of necessities, the registrar may pass interlocutory orders for staying the proceedings as he deems fit until the appeal is heard by the other courts.

In other jurisdictions, the registrar exercises his powers with the change of nomenclature. Normally, the status of the registrar is equal to that of the district judge of Higher Judicial Service.

Hong Kong

The court's registrar, senior deputy registrars and deputy registrars serve as masters of the High Court in civil trials in the Court of First Instance.

Singapore

The Supreme Court Registry is currently headed by the Registrar of the Supreme Court. He is assisted by the deputy registrar, senior assistant registrars and the assistant registrars who perform judicial functions. Certain civil proceedings in the High Court, which are heard in chambers, are dealt with by the registrars.

References

Legal professions
Management occupations